WUFT (channel 5) is a PBS member television station in Gainesville, Florida, United States. It is owned by the University of Florida alongside low-power independent station WRUF-LD (channel 10), NPR member WUFT-FM (89.1), and commercial radio stations WRUF (850 AM) and WRUF-FM (103.7). The five stations share studios at Weimer Hall on the University's campus; WUFT's transmitter is located on Northwest 53rd Avenue in Gainesville.

WUFT serves 16 counties in north-central Florida. For decades, it has also been available on cable in Jacksonville, currently on Comcast Xfinity channel 25, providing a second choice for PBS programming alongside WJCT (which signed on two months before WUFT).

History
WUFT first signed on the air with instructional programming on November 17, 1958, becoming the third educational television station in Florida.

The station was a major beneficiary of a quirk in the FCC's plan for allocating stations. In the early days of broadcast television, there were 12 VHF channels available and 69 UHF channels (later reduced to 55 in 1983). The VHF bands were more desirable because they carried longer distances. Since there were only 12 VHF channels available, there were limitations as to how closely the stations could be spaced.

After the FCC's Sixth Report and Order ended the license freeze and opened the UHF band in 1952, it devised a plan for allocating VHF licenses. Under this plan, almost all of the country would be able to receive two commercial VHF channels plus one non-commercial channel. Most of the rest of the country ("1/2") would be able to receive a third VHF channel. Other areas would be designated as "UHF islands" since they were too close to larger cities for VHF service. The "2" networks became CBS and NBC, "+1" represented non-commercial educational stations, and "1/2" became ABC (which was the weakest network usually winding up with the UHF allocation where no VHF was available).

However, what would become of the Gainesville market is sandwiched between Jacksonville (channels 4, 7, and 12) to the northeast, Tallahassee (channels 6 and 11) to the northwest, and Orlando (channels 2, 6, and 9) and Tampa Bay (channels 3, 8, 10, and 13) to the south. This created a large "doughnut" in north-central Florida where there could only be one VHF license. WUFT was fortunate enough to gain that license, and as a result, Gainesville became unique in that a public television station was the market's oldest television station (Gainesville's first commercial television station, WCJB-TV, did not sign on until 1971).

WUFT rebranded in August 2010, calling itself "Florida's 5"; this rebranding lasted until late November 2019, when the station began identifying by its callsign again, in alignment with PBS' 50th-anniversary logo redesign.

Newscasts

WUFT-TV broadcasts local newscasts staffed and produced by students in the University of Florida College of Journalism and Communications. WUFT-TV broadcasts two main newscasts, along with a variety of special reports and half-hour specials. First Edition, currently a six-minute newscast, airs weekdays at noon for 100 shows per year. WUFT News – First at 5:00 (the main newscast, formerly known as Report 5 and Evening News) is a half-hour weekday newscast at 5 p.m. which airs 200+ days per year. Starting in the spring of 2014, WUFT-TV added a 6 p.m. newscast, that is also 30 minutes long, but that has since been canceled, leaving just the 5 p.m. news. Before the move to 5 p.m., the newscast used to be on at its long-time home at 5:30 p.m., to possibly avoid competing against ABC affiliate WCJB. When it was moved to 5 p.m., the same reason existed.

Technical information

Subchannels
The station's digital signal is multiplexed:

WUFT is the only PBS member station in Florida not to carry the national 24/7 PBS Kids network on one of its subchannels.

Analog-to-digital conversion
WUFT discontinued regular programming on its analog signal, over VHF channel 5, on June 12, 2009, the official date in which full-power television stations in the United States transitioned from analog to digital broadcasts under federal mandate. The station's digital signal remained on its pre-transition UHF channel 36. Through the use of PSIP, digital television receivers display the station's virtual channel as its former VHF analog channel 5.

References

External links

University of Florida
UFT (TV)
PBS member stations
Television channels and stations established in 1958
1958 establishments in Florida